Pauini is a municipality located in the Brazilian state of Amazonas.

The population of Pauini was 19,522 in 2020.
The municipality contains the  Purus National Forest, created in 1988.
It holds 8% of the  Mapiá-Inauini National Forest, created in 1989.
It also contains 8% of the  Médio Purus Extractive Reserve, created in 2008.

References

Municipalities in Amazonas (Brazilian state)
Road-inaccessible communities of Brazil